José María Giménez Pérez (born 25 April 1980), known as Chema, is a Spanish former professional footballer who played as a goalkeeper.

He appeared in 125 Segunda División matches over six seasons, at the service of Xerez. He represented the same club in La Liga.

Club career
Born in Orihuela, Alicante, Valencian Community, Chema started his career with amateur and modest clubs, moving in the 2006–07 campaign to Xerez CD in the Segunda División. A backup in his first two years (being second choice to French Stéphane Porato in his second season) he became an undisputed starter afterwards, playing 41 games as the Andalusia side reached the top flight for the first time ever.

In La Liga, Chema backed up Brazilian Renan, newly signed from Valencia CF, his first match only coming on 7 March 2010 in a 4–2 away win against neighbours Málaga CF. After retaining his post the following two games he suffered an injury, in an eventual immediate relegation as last.

In the summer of 2014, after one season in the Super League Greece with Skoda Xanthi FC, Chema returned to his homeland and signed for Hércules CF of Segunda División B. On 4 July 2017, the 37-year-old free agent moved down to the Tercera División and joined CD Eldense.

References

External links

1980 births
Living people
People from Orihuela
Sportspeople from the Province of Alicante
Spanish footballers
Footballers from the Valencian Community
Association football goalkeepers
La Liga players
Segunda División players
Segunda División B players
Tercera División players
Real Murcia Imperial players
Alicante CF footballers
Xerez CD footballers
Hércules CF players
CD Eldense footballers
Crevillente Deportivo players
Super League Greece players
Xanthi F.C. players
Spanish expatriate footballers
Expatriate footballers in Greece
Spanish expatriate sportspeople in Greece